An Azeri is a member of the Azerbaijani ethnic group.

Azeri may also refer to:
 Azeri (horse), a thoroughbred racehorse
 Azeri language, the modern-day Turkic language
 Old Azeri, an extinct Iranian language

See also
 Azari (disambiguation)
 Azerbaijani (disambiguation)
 Azerbaijan (disambiguation)